Perle
 Perle Systems, Serial to Ethernet, Fiber to Ethernet and device networking hardware manufacturers
 Perle (grape), German wine grape
 Perle, a French attack submarine launched in 1935
 Perle, a French attack submarine launched in 1990

People 
 Perle Mesta, an American society figure, political hostess, and former ambassador to Luxembourg
 Altangerel Perle (b. 1945), a paleontologist
 John Perle (disambiguation)
 George Perle (1915-2009), a music composer
 Richard Perle (b. 1941), a U.S. official and advisor

Fictional characters 
 "Perle", a Piper Fairy, in Sailor Moon Super S: The Movie.

See also 
 Perl (disambiguation)
 Pearl (disambiguation)
 Perles (disambiguation)
 Perlemann, Perelman